Sulafa Khatun (d. after 1225), was the ruling atabeg of Maragha between 1209-1225. She was the last member of the Ahmadilis dynasty and its only female ruler. 

Sulafa Khatun succeeded Arslan-Aba II in 1209. It was uncommon and controversial for a woman to become a ruler in an Islamic state, regardless if it was as a monarch or as regent,t

though Muslim, had different customs than the Arabic and women rulers were more common within them. Ibn al-Athir expressed his shame that a woman ruled a Muslim state, and commented her rule with the quote "No people will succeed if they have a woman as their ruler" by the Prophet Muhammed. 

She was married to atabeg Korp Arslan and had a son with him, but her son died in 1208. She remarried the Eldiguzids Prince Ozberg. In 1220, the Mongols invaded Caucasus, and laid siege to Maragha in April 1221. Sulafa Khatun was besieged in the citatel of Ru'in Diz, which she successfully defended against the Mongols.   

In 1225, she was defeated by Jalal al-Din Mangburni. She divorced her spouse Ozberg, was obliged to marry Jalal al-Din Mangburni and abdicated her power to him, thus ending the Maragha state.

References

13th-century women rulers
Women in 13th-century warfare
13th-century Iranian people
Anushtegin dynasty